Wisconsin Center for Education Research (WCER), located in Madison, Wisconsin, is an education research center founded in 1964 as a branch of the School of Education at the University of Wisconsin–Madison. WCER currently has extramural funding of approximately $40 million, and is home to over 500 faculty, staff, graduate and undergraduate students who are engaged in more than 100 research projects that investigate a variety of topics in education.

Mission 
Throughout its history, WCER has maintained a commitment to improving American education by studying varied learning environments and interventions and their effects on students. Of primary concern to this mission has been the question of how educational processes and social policy can best meet the needs of students from different cultural and educational backgrounds. WCER researchers have continually asked how educational "best practices" can be made more efficient, better supported, more strategic, and thus easier to implement.

Research projects 
 ALTELLA - Alternate English Language Learning Assessment Project
 C2L - Contextualize to Learn
 CALL - Comprehensive Assessment of Leadership for Learning
 CCHER - Culture, Cognition, and Evaluation of STEM Higher Education Reform
 CCWT - Center for Research on College-Workforce Transitions
 The Discussion Project
 CEE - Center for Ethics in Education
 CIMER - Center for the Improvement of Mentored Experiences in Research
 CIRTL – Center for the Integration of Research, Training and Learning
 CRECE - Center for Research on Early Childhood Education
 Epistemic Analytics
 Field Day
 Fortalezas Familiares
 Family-School-Community Alliance
 EMPOWER
 The Institute for Innovative Assessment
 ILDL - Interactive Learning & Design Lab
 ITP - Interdisciplinary Training Program in Education Sciences
 The LEAD Center - Learning through Evaluation, Adaption, and Dissemination
 Learning, Cognition, and Development Lab
 MEP - Madison Education Partnership
 MSAN – Minority Student Achievement Network
 NSIA - National Study of Intercollegiate Athletics
 RERIC - Rural Education Research & Implementation Center
 School Mental Health Collaborative
 Study of Children's Thinking
 TDOP - Teaching Dimensions Observation Protocol
 TPdM - Tracking the Process of Data Driven Decision-Making in Higher Education
 WCER Fellows Program
 WEC - Wisconsin Evaluation Collaborative
 Wei LAB – Wisconsin’s Equity and Inclusion Laboratory
 WIDA
 VETWAYS - The Veteran Education to Workforce Affinity and Success Study
 WCER Clinical Program

Notable faculty 
 Courtney Bell became the director of WCER in 2020.
 Former WCER Director Adam Gamoran, is the president of the William T. Grant Foundation. He remains the John D. MacArthur Professor of Sociology and Educational Policy Studies.
 Gloria Ladson-Billings is an American pedagogical theorist and teacher educator on the faculty of the University of Wisconsin–Madison School of Education. She is known, among other things, for her groundbreaking work in the fields of Culturally Relevant Pedagogy and Critical race theory.

References 
 University of Wisconsin School of Education
 Wisconsin Center for Education Products and Services
 "Report: Wisconsin above average in SAT, AP scores" Badger Herald
 "WCER’s Web site is reviewed favorably by the Internet Scout Project."
  "Teacher-Evaluation Logistics Challenge States" Education Week.

University of Wisconsin–Madison